General elections were held in the Netherlands on 15 May 2002. The elections were amongst the most dramatic in Dutch history, not just in terms of the electoral results, as they were completely overshadowed by the assassination of leader Pim Fortuyn only nine days before election day.

Fortuyn had led the Pim Fortuyn List (LPF) party, a right-wing populist party that represented his political views. He had drawn controversy in the campaign with his views on Islam, attacked the government's immigration policies and had also questioned many aspects of government by the previous 'purple' cabinets of Wim Kok, which he blamed for everything from crime to waiting lists in health services. After his death, the LPF made its general election debut with 17% of the vote, coming in second place. The Christian Democratic Appeal (CDA), which took a neutral stance towards Fortuyn, gained seats to become the country's largest political party. On the other hand, the three parties in the government all lost a significant number of seats.

Two months after the election Jan Peter Balkenende formed his first cabinet, with a coalition of the CDA, the LPF and the People's Party for Freedom and Democracy (VVD). However, the LPF was unstable due to its lack of strong leadership and its members' lack of experience; this resulted in the new cabinet resigning before the end of the year.

Background
Prime Minister Wim Kok had been in power since the 1994 general election in a coalition between his Labour Party (PvdA), the People's Party for Freedom and Democracy (VVD) and Democrats 66 (D66). The government, which won a second term in the 1998 general election, was often referred to as a 'purple' coalition due to the participation of the 'red' Labour Party and the 'blue' VVD. During its time in power, the government had often enjoyed high approval ratings and presided over a strong economy. They had also introduced innovative social legislation, such as the introduction of same-sex marriage and euthanasia. Kok announced in December 2001 that he would retire from the premiership at the next election. Ad Melkert then replaced Kok as the party leader. The Christian Democratic Appeal, the largest opposition party, was led by newly elected leader Jan Peter Balkenende. Balkenende was at the time considered to be an interim leader who lacked charisma or experience, but his campaign would ultimately prove relatively successful.

Campaign
At the start of the year, Melkert and the VVD leader Hans Dijkstal appeared to be the frontrunners in the race to become Prime Minister. The situation changed with the arrival of the controversial politician Pim Fortuyn. Fortuyn was a critic of Islam and had questioned whether its culture was compatible with Western society even before the September 11 attacks. He was elected the leader of Liveable Netherlands in November 2001, but he was expelled from the party after making controversial comments in an interview with De Volkskrant on 9 February 2002. Fortuyn had described Islam as a "backward culture", criticizing its attitude to homosexuality (he himself was openly gay). Part of the reason for the uproar was that the Dutch word for "backward" (achterlijk) can also be used in an insulting sense (with a similar meaning to the word "retarded"); Fortuyn stated he used the word in the former sense. Two days later, he formed his own party, the Pim Fortuyn List (LPF) in order to contest to the upcoming general election, while maintaining the leadership over the local Livable Rotterdam party.

In the 2002 municipal elections, held on 6 March, Liveable Rotterdam took 35% of the vote in the city of Rotterdam, a city with a high immigrant population. They formed the city's first non-Labour government since the Second World War. In the same month, he released the book De puinhopen van acht jaar Paars (The Wreckage of eight purple years) criticising the record of the governing coalition. The Economist described the rise in support for Fortuyn as a shock for the Dutch political establishment and their traditional system of consensus.

The government resigned on 16 April - only a month before polling day - after the Netherlands Institute for War Documentation published the Srebrenica: a 'safe' area report, criticizing the Dutch government's handling of the events that led to the Srebrenica massacre in 1995. However, the ministers remained in office as a caretaker government until after the elections and the formation of the next government, and the date of the election was not changed.

On 6 May, Fortuyn was assassinated in Hilversum by Volkert van der Graaf. Months later, Van der Graaf stated his motivation was his belief that Fortuyn was exploiting Muslims as "scapegoats" and targeting "the weak members of society" in seeking political power. The murder was a shock to the Netherlands; it was denounced by Kok and other Dutch politicians and other national leaders. It was the country's first political assassination in modern times.

Opinion polls

Result
The great losers of the election were Labour Party, People's Party for Freedom and Democracy and Democrats 66, the coalition parties of the 'purple' cabinets. Especially the Labour Party under the technocratic leadership of Ad Melkert suffered a landslide defeat.

The Christian Democratic Appeal was the surprising winner of the election, gaining 14 seats (from 29 to 43) and becoming the largest party in the House of Representatives. This success is in part owed to its new leader Jan Peter Balkenende, who went on to become prime minister, and to its neutral attitude in the debate with Fortuyn, not having participated in the supposed ‘demonization’ by the political Left.

Fortuyn's former party Livable Netherlands also contested the election. While they had been overshadowed by Fortuyn, they also entered the House of Representatives, winning 2 seats.

The 15 May 2002 election was the beginning of a year of political chaos in the Netherlands following the LPF leader's assassination on 6 May the same year. The power vacuum resulted in violent internal conflicts in LPF, which eventually led to the fall of the first Balkenende cabinet (CDA-LPF-VVD), which governed from 22 July 2002 to 16 October 2002. The CDA once again became a coalition party after eight years in opposition (1994–2002) in a government which, however, became the shortest-ruling Dutch cabinet since the Second World War, lasting less than five months.

By province

References

Further reading

2002
2002 elections in the Netherlands
May 2000 events in Europe